USS Mahlon S. Tisdale (FFG-27), nineteenth ship of the Oliver Hazard Perry class of guided-missile frigates, was named for Vice Admiral Mahlon Street Tisdale (1890–1972).  Ordered from Todd Pacific Shipyards, Los Angeles Division, San Pedro, California, on 23 January 1978 as part of the FY78 program, Mahlon S. Tisdale was laid down on 19 March 1980, launched on 7 February 1981, and commissioned on 27 November 1982.

Mahlon S. Tisdale (FFG-27) was the first ship of that name in the U.S. Navy.

TCG Gökçeada (F 494) 
Decommissioned on 27 September 1996 and stricken on 20 February 1998, she was transferred to Turkey on 5 April 1999 as that nation's TCG Gökçeada (F 494). As of 2018, she is still in active service.

References

External links 

MaritimeQuest USS Mahlon S. Tisdale FFG-27 pages
GlobalSecurity.org FFG-27
 

Oliver Hazard Perry-class frigates of the United States Navy
Ships built in Los Angeles
1981 ships
Ships transferred from the United States Navy to the Turkish Navy